Michael Gurrie (born 16 April 1968) is a former Australian rules footballer who played for Geelong in the Australian Football League (AFL) in 1990.

References

External links

Living people
1968 births
Geelong Football Club players
Geelong West Football Club players
Australian rules footballers from Victoria (Australia)